Warmia Grajewo is a Polish football club playing currently in III Liga (4th level) . The club was founded in 1924. It's one of the oldest football clubs in Podlasie arena.

Warmia in the 21st century

External links
 Official website
 Warmia Grajewo at the 90minut.pl website (Polish)

Association football clubs established in 1924
Football clubs in Podlaskie Voivodeship
Grajewo County
1924 establishments in Poland